Wuershan (simplified Chinese: 乌尔善) is a  Chinese film director who was born in Hohhot, Inner Mongolia on June 10, 1972. He is of Mongol ethnicity.

Wuershan's first feature film was Soap Opera (2004), for which he was awarded the FIPRESCI Award at the Pusan International Film Festival. He went on to direct blockbusters The Butcher, the Chef and the Swordsman (2010), Painted Skin: The Resurrection (2012), and Mojin: The Lost Legend (2015), for which he was awarded the Hundred Flowers Award for Best Director at the 33rd Hundred Flowers Awards. In 2019, he started on the production of the Fengshen Trilogy.

Early life
Wuershan was born in Hohhot, Inner Mongolia, China, in 1972.

At 16 he enrolled to a high school affiliated to China's Central Academy of Fine Arts, and in 1992 he was admitted to the oil painting department of the latter. However, he dropped out the following year, and in 1994 started studying directing at the Beijing Film Academy, graduating from the latter in 1998. He started his career by making TV commercials, becoming successful in the business. He continued to work as a TV commercials director, video artist and avant-garde artist until his debut in movie industry with the 2004 film Soap Opera.

Career
Wuershan film debut came with Soap Opera (2004). For this movie, he won the FIPRESCI Award at the Pusan International Film Festival in 2004.

The Butcher, the Chef and the Swordsman
On September 16, 2010, Wuershan's second feature film debuted at the Toronto International Film Festival. The Butcher, the Chef and the Swordsman premiered on September 16, 2010, at the Toronto International Film Festival in the Midnight Madness section marking the first time a film from China has been shown at this sidebar. It received mixed reviews from critics. The film was also screened at the Pusan Film Festival. It was presented by Doug Liman at the festival. It was released theatrically on 17 March 2011 in Southeast Asia, North America, Australia and New Zealand simultaneously. Described as an avant-garde martial arts comedy, the film is split into three stories titled "Desire", "Vengeance" and "Greed," and it follows the "journey of a mystical blade as it passes through the hands of three ambitious men."

Painted Skin: The Resurrection
Wuershan's third feature film, Painted Skin: The Resurrection, was released on June 28, 2012. The film, which has an 83% approval rating on aggregate site Rotten Tomatoes, and is described as a "deliciously nutty love story," tells about Xiaowei, a malevolent fox spirit, who consumes men's hearts to preserve her beauty and is looking for a heart that must be freely given to her in order to become human, while lovesick Princess Jing, who wears a mask to conceal her scarred face, looks for true love. She winds up deciding to exchange her pure heart for the fox daemon's beauty. With a total box office gross of $115.07 million, the film became the highest grossing domestic film in China beating the previous record holder Let the Bullets Fly.

Mojin: The Lost Legend
His fourth feature film was Mojin: The Lost Legend, an action adventure fantasy thriller film based on the novel Ghost Blows Out the Light. It was released on December 18, 2015. The film won several awards, including Best Visual Effects at the Beijing College Student Film Festival and the Golden Horse Awards, and Wuershan was named Best Director at the 33rd Hundred Flowers Awards. The movie however received mixed reviews from western critics. The film was a huge box-office success, grossing over US$278 million from a budget of 37.

Fengshen Trilogy
In 2019, he began on the production on the Fengshen Trilogy. Sometimes dubbed as "China’s ‘Lord of the Rings’", it is the "most ambitious and expensive production in Chinese history." The production has a crew of over two thousands employees, and a budget of $445 million over three films. The movie is a retelling of Investiture of the Gods, a 16th-century Chinese novel and one of the major vernacular Chinese works in the gods-and-demons (shenmo) genre written during the Ming dynasty (1368–1644).

The novel combines elements of history, folklore, mythology, legends and fantasy, with a story set in the era of the decline of the Shang dynasty (1600–1046 BC) and the rise of the Zhou dynasty (1046–256 BC). It tells about the downfall of King Zhou, the Shang Dynasty's last ruler. He becomes a tyrant after having been "bewitched by a fox spirit posing as his concubine." An epic battle "rages to defeat him, involving gods, demons and other supernatural beings." Barrie M. Osborne, producer of The Lord of the Rings: The Return of the King, was involved in the production.

Filmography 
 Soap Opera (肥皂剧), 2004
 The Butcher, the Chef and the Swordsman (刀见笑), 2010
 Painted Skin: The Resurrection (画皮II), 2012
 Mojin: The Lost Legend (寻龙诀), 2015

Awards and nominations

References

External links 

1972 births
Chinese film directors
Living people
People from Hohhot
Chinese people of Mongolian descent